Castanopsis oligoneura is a tree in the family Fagaceae. The specific epithet  is from the Greek meaning "few nerves", referring to the leaf venation.

Description
The brownish bark is smooth to lenticellate.

Distribution and habitat
Castanopsis oligoneura is endemic to Borneo. Its habitat is lowland dipterocarp forests up to  altitude.

References

oligoneura
Endemic flora of Borneo
Trees of Borneo
Plants described in 1968
Flora of the Borneo lowland rain forests